A list of notable engineers from Slovenia:

 Maks Klodič Sabladoski
 Bojan Kraut
 Herman Potočnik
 Zoran Rant
 Jurij Vega
 Milan Vidmar
 Svetopolk Pivko

 
Engineer